Fred Malatesta (April 18, 1889 – April 8, 1952) was an American film actor. He appeared in more than 110 films between 1915 and 1941. He was born in Naples, Italy, and died in Burbank, California.

Selected filmography

 Sherlock Holmes (1916) - 'Lightfoot' McTague
 The Legion of Death (1918) - Grand Duke Paul
 The Claim (1918) - Ted 'Blackie' Jerome
 The Demon (1918) - Count Theodore de Seramo
 The Border Raiders (1918) - 'Square Deal' Dixon
 The Greatest Thing in Life (1918) - (uncredited)
 Terror of the Range (1919) - Black John
 Full of Pep (1919) - General Lopanzo
 The Devil's Trail (1919) - Dubec
 The Four-Flusher (1919) - Señor Emanuelo Romez
 The Valley of Tomorrow (1920) - Enrico Colonna
 The Best of Luck  (1920) - Lanzana
 Big Happiness (1920) - Raoul de Bergerac
 The Challenge of the Law (1920) - Jules Lafitte
 The Sins of Rosanne (1920) - Syke Ravenal
 Risky Business (1920) - Ralli
 All Dolled Up (1921) - Amilo Rodolpho
 The Mask (1921) - Señor Enrico Keralio
 Little Lord Fauntleroy (1921) - Dick
 The Woman He Loved (1922) - Max Levy
 White Shoulders (1922) - Maurice, a Modiste
 Refuge (1923) - Gustav Kenski
 The Girl Who Came Back (1923) - Ramon Valhays
 The Man Between (1923) - Joe Cateau
 The Lullaby (1924) - Pietro
 The Night Hawk (1924) - José Valdez
 The Reckless Age (1924) - Manuel Gonzáles
 Broadway or Bust (1924) - Count Dardnelle
 Honor Among Men (1924) - Count De Winter
 Forbidden Paradise (1924) - French ambassador
 Without Mercy (1925) - Ducrow
 Madame Mystery (1926, Short) - Man of a Thousand Eyes
 Kiki (1926) - Cheron, the Tenor (uncredited)
 Long Fliv the King (1926, Short) - Hamir of Uvocado - the Prime Minister
 Bardelys the Magnificent (1926) - Castelrous
 Get 'Em Young (1926, Short) - Executor
 Eve's Love Letters (1927, Short) - Mr. X's Accomplice (uncredited)
 The Wagon Show (1928) - Vicarino
 The Gate Crasher (1928) - Julio
 The Peacock Fan (1929) - Thomas Elton
 The Black Book (1929, Serial) - Sudro
 El precio de un beso (1930)
 Wings of Adventure (1930) - Don Ricardo Diaz San Pablo La Pandella - 'La Panthera'
 Caught Cheating (1931) - Tobey Moran
 La mujer X (1931) - LaRoque
 The Big Trail (1931) - Bascom
 Possessed (1931) - Party Waiter (uncredited)
 The Passionate Plumber (1932) - Tony's Second (uncredited)
 Whistlin' Dan (1932) - Pedro - Henchman (uncredited)
 The Man from Yesterday (1932) - Gendarme (uncredited)
 Get That Girl (1932) - Dr. Sandro Tito
 Trouble in Paradise (1932) - Hotel Manager (uncredited)
 A Farewell to Arms (1932) - Manera (uncredited)
 The Girl in 419 (1933) - Hotel Arcady Manager (uncredited)
 Laughing at Life (1933) - Capt. Garcia (uncredited)
 Beer and Pretzels (1933, Short) - Restaurant manager (uncredited)
 L'amour guide (1933)
 What's Your Racket? (1934) - Benton
 Riptide (1934) - Headwaiter (uncredited)
 Picture Brides (1934) - Castro
 Granaderos del amor (1934) - Comandante
 The Thin Man (1934) - Joe - Headwaiter (uncredited)
 Call It Luck (1934) - Judge Venturini (uncredited)
 Student Tour (1934) - French Manager (uncredited)
 The Merry Widow (1934) - Ambassador (uncredited)
 The Gay Bride (1934) - French Officer (uncredited)
 Enter Madame (1935) - Hotel Clerk (uncredited)
 Let's Live Tonight (1935) - Headwaiter (uncredited)
 Fighting Shadows (1935) - Duquesne (uncredited)
 Under the Pampas Moon (1935) - Doorman (uncredited)
 Love Me Forever (1935) - Italian Man (uncredited)
 The Crusades (1935) - William - King of Sicily
 Dressed to Thrill (1935) - Italian Captain (uncredited)
 1,000 Dollars a Minute (1935) - La Valle (uncredited)
 A Night at the Opera (1935) - Stagehand (uncredited)
 The Lone Wolf Returns (1935) - French Official (uncredited)
 Senor Jim (1936) - Nick Zellini
 Modern Times (1936) - Cafe Head Waiter
 Lady of Secrets (1936) - French Official (uncredited)
 Under Two Flags (1936) - Chasseur Lieutenant (uncredited)
 Mary of Scotland (1936) - Minor Role (uncredited)
 Anthony Adverse (1936) - Stranger (uncredited)
 Dodsworth (1936) - Waiter on Last Ship (uncredited)
 Love on the Run (1936) - French Waiter (uncredited)
 Mama Steps Out (1937) - French Guard (scenes deleted)
 Espionage (1937) - French Pickpocket (uncredited)
 The Gold Racket (1937) - Ricardo (uncredited)
 The Bride Wore Red (1937) - Rudi's Waiter (uncredited)
 Conquest (1937) - Waiter (uncredited)
 Beg, Borrow or Steal (1937) - Majordomo (uncredited)
 The Black Doll (1938) - Esteban, the butler
 International Settlement (1938) - Italian Officer (uncredited)
 Four Men and a Prayer (1938) - Officer Under Gen. Sebastian (uncredited)
 Port of Seven Seas (1938) - Bird Seller (uncredited)
 I'll Give a Million (1938) - Gendarme (uncredited)
 Suez (1938) - Jewel Merchant (uncredited)
 Submarine Patrol (1938) - Italian Gendarme at the 'Maria Ann' (uncredited)
 Sharpshooters (1938) - Policeman (uncredited)
 Artists and Models Abroad (1938) - Treasury Official (uncredited)
 Blackwell's Island (1939) - Third Dockworker (uncredited)
 Love Affair (1939) - Shipboard Photographer (uncredited)
 Juarez (1939) - Señor Salas (uncredited)
 Bridal Suite (1939) - Cassini - in Shipboard Brawl (uncredited)
 Road to Singapore (1940) - Native Policeman (uncredited)
 Argentine Nights (1940) - Plainclothesman (uncredited)
 Rangers of Fortune (1940) - Genoa (uncredited)
 Down Argentine Way (1940) - Horserace Loser at Fiesta (uncredited)
 Arise, My Love (1940) - Spanish Mechanic (uncredited)
 The Mark of Zorro (1940) - Sentry (uncredited)
 That Night in Rio (1941) - Butler (scenes deleted)
 Blood and Sand (1941) - Waiter (uncredited)
 Week-End in Havana (1941) - Flores - Roulette Croupier (uncredited)

References

External links

1889 births
1952 deaths
American male film actors
American male silent film actors
20th-century American male actors